Isotretinoin, also known as 13-cis-retinoic acid and sold under the brand name Accutane among others, is a medication primarily used to treat severe acne. It is also used to prevent certain skin cancers (squamous-cell carcinoma), and in the treatment of other cancers. It is used to treat harlequin-type ichthyosis, a usually lethal skin disease, and lamellar ichthyosis. It is a retinoid, meaning it is related to vitamin A, and is found in small quantities naturally in the body. Its isomer, tretinoin, is also an acne drug.

The most common adverse effects are dry lips (cheilitis), dry and fragile skin, and an increased susceptibility to sunburn.  Uncommon and rare side effects include muscle aches and pains (myalgias), and headaches. Isotretinoin is known to cause birth defects due to in-utero exposure because of the molecule's close resemblance to retinoic acid, a natural vitamin A derivative that controls normal embryonic development. It is also associated with psychiatric side effects, most commonly depression but also, more rarely, psychosis and unusual behaviours. Other rare side effects include hyperostosis and premature epiphyseal closure, which have been reported to be persistent.

Isotretinoin was patented in 1969 and approved for medical use in 1982. In 2020, it was the 264th most commonly prescribed medication in the United States, with more than 1million prescriptions.

Medical uses 
Isotretinoin is used primarily for severe cystic acne and acne that has not responded to other treatments.  Many dermatologists also support its use for treatment of lesser degrees of acne that prove resistant to other treatments, or that produce physical or psychological scarring. Isotretinoin is not indicated for treatment of prepubertal acne and is not recommended in children less than 12 years of age.

It is also somewhat effective for hidradenitis suppurativa and some cases of severe rosacea. It can also be used to help treat harlequin ichthyosis, lamellar ichthyosis and is used in xeroderma pigmentosum cases to relieve keratoses. Isotretinoin has been used to treat the extremely rare condition fibrodysplasia ossificans progressiva. It is also used for the treatment of neuroblastoma, a form of nerve cancer.

Isotretinoin therapy has furthermore proven effective against genital warts in experimental use, but is rarely used for this indication as there are more effective treatments. Isotretinoin may represent an efficacious and safe alternative systemic form of therapy for recalcitrant condylomata acuminata (RCA) of the cervix. In most countries this therapy is currently unapproved and only used if other therapies failed.

Prescribing restrictions 
Isotretinoin is a teratogen; there is about a 20–35% risk for congenital defects in infants exposed to the drug in utero, and about 30–60% of children exposed to isotretinoin prenatally have been reported to show neurocognitive impairment. Because of this risk, there are strict controls prescribing isotretinoin to women who have potential to become (or be) pregnant while taking isotretinoin and many strongly advise to terminate their pregnancies because of the 20-60% risk.

In the United States, since March 2006, the dispensing of isotretinoin is run through a website called iPLEDGE. The US Food and Drug Administration (FDA) requires the companies marketing the drug to put this website in place as a risk evaluation and mitigation strategy. These companies formed a group called the Isotretinoin Products Manufacturing Group, and it hired Covance to run the website. Prescribers, pharmacists, and all people to whom the drug is prescribed need to register on the site and log information into it. Women with child-bearing potential must commit to using two forms of effective contraception simultaneously for the duration of isotretinoin therapy and for a month immediately preceding and a month immediately following therapy. Additionally, they must have two negative pregnancy tests 30 days apart and have negative pregnancy tests before each prescription is written.

In most countries, isotretinoin can only be prescribed by dermatologists or specialist physicians; some countries also allow limited prescription by general practitioners and family doctors. In the United Kingdom and Australia, isotretinoin may be prescribed only by or under the supervision of a consultant dermatologist. Because severe cystic acne has the potential to cause permanent scarring over a short period, restrictions on its more immediate availability have proved contentious. In New Zealand, isotretinoin can be prescribed by any doctor but subsidised only when prescribed by a vocationally-registered general practitioner, dermatologist or nurse practitioner.

Adverse effects 
Increasingly higher dosages will result in higher toxicity, resembling vitamin A toxicity. Adverse effects include:

Possible permanent effects
Isotretinoin may stop long bone growth in young people who are still growing. Premature epiphyseal closure can occur in people with acne receiving recommended doses of Accutane.

Generally, though, premature epiphyseal closure seems to be primarily related to:

 high doses of isotretinoin beyond the recommended dose of 1 mg/kg/day
 long-duration beyond the usual course of what is required for an acne patient for treatment (usually 5–7 months)
 early onset of treatment (young teenage age 12–14 or younger)

Isotretinoin is known to cause meibomian gland dysfunction which causes persistent keratoconjunctivitis sicca (dry eye).  Problems with the meibomian and salivary glands are likely due to the non-selective apoptosis of the cells of the exocrine glands. Decreased night vision has been reported to persist in some people after discontinuation of isotretinoin therapy.

Sexual 
Isotretinoin is also associated with sexual side effects, namely erectile dysfunction and reduced libido. In October 2017, the UK MHRA issued a Drug Safety Update to physicians in response to reports of these problems. This was in response to an EU review, published in August 2017, which states that a plausible physiological explanation of these side effects "may be a reduction in plasma testosterone". The review also stated that "the product information should be updated to include ‘sexual dysfunction including erectile dysfunction and decreased libido’ as an undesirable effect with an unknown frequency". There have also been reports of spermatogenesis disorders, such as oligospermia. 27 cases of sexual dysfunction report either negative dechallenge or positive dechallenge.

Skin 
The most common side effects are mucocutaneous: dry lips, skin and nose. Other common mucocutaneous side effects are inflammation and chapping of the lips (cheilitis), redness of the skin (erythema), rashes, peeling, eczema (dermatitis), itching (pruritus) and nose bleeds (epistaxis). Absence of dryness of the lips is considered an indication of non-compliance with treatment (not taking the drug as advised), as it occurs in almost all people who take it.

Regular use of lip balm and moisturizer is recommended throughout a course of treatment to reduce these problems. The dose may need to be decreased to reduce the severity of these side effects.  The skin becomes more fragile—especially to frictional forces—and may not heal as quickly as normal. Wound healing is delayed. For this reason, elective surgery, waxing of hair, tattooing, tattoo removal, piercings, dermabrasion, exfoliation, etc., are not recommended. Treatment of acne scars is generally deferred until 12 months after completion of a course of isotretinoin.

Teratogenicity 
 
Isotretinoin is a teratogen highly likely to cause birth defects if taken by women during pregnancy or even a short time before conception. A few of the more common birth defects this drug can cause are hearing and visual impairment, missing or malformed earlobes, facial dysmorphism, and abnormalities in brain function. Isotretinoin is classified as FDA Pregnancy Category X and ADEC Category X, and use is contraindicated in pregnancy. In the EU, isotretinoin (oral) is contraindicated in pregnancy and must not be taken by women able to have children unless the conditions of a pregnancy prevention programme are met.

The manufacturer recommends pregnancy be ruled out two weeks prior to commencement of isotretinoin, and women should use two simultaneous forms of effective contraception at least one month prior to commencement, during, and for at least one month following isotretinoin therapy.

In the US, around 2000 women became pregnant while taking the drug between 1982 and 2000, with most pregnancies ending in abortion or miscarriage. About 160 babies with birth defects were born. After the FDA put the more strict iPLEDGE program in place for the companies marketing the drug in the US, in 2011, 155 pregnancies occurred (0.12%) among 129,544 women of childbearing potential taking isotrentinoin.

People taking isotretinoin are not permitted to donate blood during and for at least one month after discontinuation of therapy due to its teratogenicity.

Psychological effects
Rare psychological side effects may include depression, worsening of pre-existing depression, aggressive tendencies, irritable mood and anxiety. Very rare effects include abnormal behaviour, psychosis, suicidal ideation, suicide attempts and suicide.  In a total of 5577 adverse reactions reported to the UK's MHRA up to 31 March 2017, the plurality (1207, or 22%) concerned psychiatric effects. There were 85 reports of suicidal ideation, 56 of suicide and 43 of suicide attempts.

The association between isotretinoin use and psychopathology has been controversial. Beginning in 1983, isolated case reports emerged suggesting mood change, particularly depression, occurring during or soon after isotretinoin use. A number of studies have been conducted since then of the drug's effect on depression, psychosis, suicidal thoughts and other psychological effects.

Depression and suicidality 
Isotretinoin is the only non-psychiatric drug on the FDA's top 10 list of drugs associated with depression and is also within the top 10 for suicide attempts. A black box warning for suicide, depression and psychosis has been present on isotretinoin's packaging in the United States since 2005. In March 2018, European Medicines Agency issued a warning on a possible risk of neuropsychiatric disorders (such as depression, anxiety and mood changes) following the use of oral retinoids, including isotretinoin, though the limitations of the available data did not allow them to clearly establish whether this risk was due to the use of retinoids.

In 2012, a systematic review covering all articles in the literature related to isotretinoin, depression and suicide, as well as articles related to class effect, dose response, and biologic plausibility found that the literature reviewed was consistent with an association of isotretinoin administration and depression and with suicide in a subgroup of vulnerable individuals. Following this systematic review, in a 2014 review a group of Australian dermatologists and psychiatrists collaborated on a set of recommendations for safe prescribing of isotretinoin. However, whether isotretinoin use is causally associated with mental illness remains controversial.

Evidence for depression being causally associated with isotretinoin use includes 41 reports of positive challenge/dechallenge/rechallenge with isotretinoin, involving administering isotretinoin, withdrawing the drug, and then re-administering it. The majority of these cases had no psychiatric history. There is also a temporal relationship between the development of depression and initiation of isotretinoin treatment, with most cases developing after 1–2 months of treatment. Further, higher doses of isotretinoin increase the risk of developing depression, with 25% of people showing depression on a dose of 3 mg/kg/day as compared with 3–4% at normal doses. Studies have uncovered several biological processes which may credibly explain the affective changes induced by isotretinoin.

Psychosis 
Isotretinoin has also been linked to psychosis. Many of the side effects of isotretinoin mimic hypervitaminosis A, which has been associated with psychotic symptoms. The dopamine hypothesis of schizophrenia and psychosis suggests that an increase in dopaminergic stimulation or sensitivity in the limbic system causes psychotic symptoms.

It has been suggested that dysregulation of retinoid receptors by retinoids such as isotretinoin may cause schizophrenia. The evidence for this is threefold: transcriptional activation of the dopamine D2 receptor – in addition to serotonin and glutamate receptors – is regulated by retinoic acid; schizophrenia and the retinoid cascade have been linked to the same gene loci; and retinoid dysfunction causes congenital anomalies identical to those observed in people with schizophrenia. Further, the expression of dopamine receptors has indeed been shown to be regulated by retinoic acid.

Musculoskeletal 
Isotretinoin has a number of muscoloskeletal effects. Myalgia (muscular pain) and arthralgia (joint pain) are rare side effects. Retinoids, such as high dose etretinate, are well known to cause bone changes, the most common type of which is hyperostotic changes (excessive bone growth), especially in growing children and adolescents. Other problems include premature epiphyseal closure and calcification of tendons and ligaments. The bones of the spine and feet are most commonly affected. Risk factors for skeletal effects include older age, greater dosage and longer course of treatment. Most bone changes cause no symptoms and may only be noticed using X-ray imaging.

Gastrointestinal 
Isotretinoin may cause non-specific gastrointestinal symptoms including nausea, diarrhea and abdominal pain. The drug is associated with inflammatory bowel disease (IBD)—ulcerative colitis, but not Crohn's disease.  There are also reports of people developing irritable bowel syndrome (IBS) and worsening of existing IBS.

Eyes 
Isotretinoin and other retinoids are well known to affect the eyes. Dry eyes are very common during treatment and is caused by isotretinoin's apoptotic effect on the meibomian glands. Some people develop contact lens intolerance as a result. In some people, these changes are long-lasting or irreversible and represent Meibomian Gland Dysfunction (MGD). Other common effects on the eyes include inflammation of the eyelid (blepharitis), red eye caused by conjunctivitis and irritation of the eye. More rare ocular side effects include blurred vision, decreased night vision (which may be permanent), colour blindness, development of corneal opacities, inflammation of the cornea (keratitis), swelling of the optic disk (papilloedema, associated with IIH), photophobia and other visual disturbances.

Pharmacology

Mechanism of action 
Isotretinoin's exact mechanism of action is unknown, but several studies have shown that isotretinoin induces apoptosis (programmatic cell death) in various cells in the body. Cell death may be instigated in the meibomian glands, hypothalamic cells, hippocampus cells and—important for treatment of acne—in sebaceous gland cells. Isotretinoin has a low affinity for retinoic acid receptors (RAR) and retinoid X receptors (RXR), but may be converted intracellularly to metabolites that act as agonists of RAR and RXR nuclear receptors.

One study suggests the drug amplifies production of neutrophil gelatinase-associated lipocalin (NGAL) in the skin, which has been shown to reduce sebum production by inducing apoptosis in sebaceous gland cells, while exhibiting an antimicrobial effect on Cutibacterium acnes. The drug decreases the size and sebum output of the sebaceous glands. Isotretinoin is the only available acne drug that affects all four major pathogenic processes in acne, which distinguishes it from alternative treatments (such as antibiotics) and accounts for its efficacy in severe, nodulocystic cases. The effect of isotretinoin on sebum production can be temporary, or remission of the disease can be "complete and prolonged."

Isotretinoin has been speculated to down-regulate the enzyme telomerase and hTERT, inhibiting "cellular immortalization and tumorigenesis." In a 2007 study, isotretinoin was proven to inhibit the action of the metalloprotease MMP-9 (gelatinase) in sebum without any influence in the action of TIMP1 and TIMP2 (the tissue inhibitors of metalloproteases). It is already known that metalloproteases play an important role in the pathogenesis of acne.

CNS activities 
A possible biological basis for the case reports of depression involves decreased metabolism in the orbitofrontal cortex (OFC) of the frontal lobe. It has also been found that decreased OFC metabolism was correlated with headaches. People reporting headache as a side effect often report comorbid neuropsychiatric symptoms, especially depression; a statistically significant relationship between headache and depression has been established. It is suggested that people sensitive to isotretinoin-induced CNS effects may also be susceptible to other psychiatric side effects such as depression.

Studies in mice and rats have found that retinoids, including isotretinoin, bind to dopaminergic receptors in the central nervous system. Isotretinoin may affect dopaminergic neurotransmission by disrupting the structure of dopamine receptors and decreasing dopaminergic activity. The dopaminergic system is implicated in numerous psychological disorders, including depression. Isotretinoin is also thought to affect the serotonergic system – it increases expression of 5-HT1A receptors in the pre-synaptic neuron, which inhibit serotonin secretion. Isotretinoin also directly and indirectly increases the translation of the serotonin transporter protein (SERT), leading to increased reuptake and consequently reduced synaptic availability of serotonin.

Inhibition of hippocampal neurogenesis may also play a role in the development of isotretinoin-induced depression. A further effect of isotretinoin on the brain involves retinoic acid function in the hypothalamus, the hormone regulatory centre of the brain and part of the hypothalamus-pituitary-adrenal axis, a key part of the body's stress response. Other brain regions regulated by retinoic acid and potentially disrupted by isotretinoin include the frontal cortex and the striatum.

Pharmacokinetics and pharmacodynamics 
Oral isotretinoin is best absorbed when taken with a high-fat meal, because it has a high level of lipophilicity. The efficacy of isotretinoin doubles when taken after a high-fat meal compared to when taken without food. Due to isotretinoin's molecular relationship to vitamin A, it should not be taken with vitamin A supplements due to the danger of toxicity through cumulative overdosing. Accutane also negatively interacts with tetracycline, another class of acne drug, and with micro-dosed ('mini-pill') progesterone preparations, norethisterone/ethinylestradiol ('OrthoNovum 7/7/7'), St. John's Wort, phenytoin, and systemic corticosteroids.

Isotretinoin is primarily (99.9%) bound to plasma proteins, mostly albumin. Three metabolites of isotretinoin are detectable in human plasma after oral administration: 4-oxo-isotretinoin, retinoid acid (tretinoin), and 4-oxo-retinoic acid (4-oxo-tretinoin). Isotretinoin also oxidizes, irreversibly, to 4-oxo-isotretinoin—which forms its geometric isomer 4-oxo-tretinoin. After an orally-administered, 80 mg dose of liquid suspension 14C-isotretinoin, 14C-activity in blood declines with a half-life of 90 hours. The metabolites of isotretinoin and its conjugates are then excreted in the subject's urine and faeces in relatively equal amounts. After a single, 80 mg oral dose of Isotretinoin to 74 healthy adult subjects under fed conditions, the mean ±SD elimination half-life (t1/2) of isotretinoin and 4-oxo-isotretinoin were 21.0 ± 8.2 hours and 24.0 ± 5.3 hours, respectively. After both single and multiple doses, the observed accumulation ratios of isotretinoin ranged from 0.90 to 5.43 in people with cystic acne.

History 
The compound 13-cis retinoic acid was first studied in the 1960s at Roche Laboratories in Switzerland by Werner Bollag as a treatment for skin cancer. Experiments completed in 1971 showed that the compound was likely to be ineffective for cancer but, surprisingly, that it could be useful to treat acne. However, they also showed that the compound was likely to cause birth defects, so in light of the events around thalidomide, Roche abandoned the product. In 1979, an article was published reporting the drug's effectiveness as a treatment of cystic and conglobate acne on fourteen patients, thirteen of which experienced complete clearing of their disease. In clinical trials, subjects were carefully screened to avoid including women who were or might become pregnant. Roche's New Drug Application for isotretinoin for the treatment of acne included data showing that the drug caused birth defects in rabbits. The FDA approved the application in 1982.

Scientists involved in the clinical trials published articles warning of birth defects at the same time the drug was launched in the US, but nonetheless, isotretinoin was taken up quickly and widely, both among dermatologists and general practitioners. Cases of birth defects showed up in the first year, leading the FDA to begin publishing case reports and to Roche sending warning letters to doctors and placing warning stickers on drug bottles, and including stronger warnings on the label. Lawsuits against Roche started to be filed. In 1983 the FDA's advisory committee was convened and recommended stronger measures, which the FDA took and were that time unprecedented: warning blood banks not to accept blood from people taking the drug and adding a warning to the label advising women to start taking contraceptives a month before starting the drug. However, the use of the drug continued to grow, as did the number of babies born with birth defects. In 1985 the label was updated to include a boxed warning. In early 1988 the FDA called for another advisory committee, and FDA employees prepared an internal memo estimating that around 1,000 babies had been born with birth defects due to isotretinoin, that up to around 1,000 miscarriages had been caused, and that between 5,000 and 7,000 women had had abortions due to isotretinoin. The memo was leaked to The New York Times a few days before the meeting, leading to a storm of media attention. In the committee meeting, dermatologists and Roche each argued to keep the drug on the market but to increase education efforts; pediatricians and the Centers for Disease Control and Prevention (CDC) argued to withdraw the drug from the market. The committee recommended restricting physicians who could prescribe the drug and requiring a second opinion before it could be prescribed. The FDA, believing it did not have authority under the law to restrict who had the right to prescribe the drug, kept the drug on the market but took further unprecedented measures: it required Roche to make warnings yet more visible and graphic, provide doctors with informed consent forms to be used when prescribing the drug, and to conduct follow up studies to test whether the measures were reducing exposure of pregnant women to the drug. Roche implemented those measures, and offered to pay for contraception counseling and pregnancy testing for women prescribed the drug; the program was called the "Pregnancy Prevention Program".

A CDC report published in 2000, showed problems with the Pregnancy Prevention Program and showed that the increase in prescriptions was from off-label use, and prompted Roche to revamp its program, renaming it the "Targeted Pregnancy Prevention Program" and adding label changes like requirements for two pregnancy tests, two kinds of contraception, and for doctors to provide pharmacists with prescriptions directly; providing additional educational materials, and providing free pregnancy tests. The FDA had another advisory meeting in late 2000 that again debated how to prevent pregnant women from being exposed to the drug; dermatologists testified about the remarkable efficacy of the drug, the psychological impact of acne, and demanded autonomy to prescribe the drug; others argued that the drug be withdrawn or much stricter measures be taken. In 2001 the FDA announced a new regulatory scheme called SMART (the System to Manage Accutane Related Teratogenicity) that required Roche to provide defined training materials to doctors, and for doctors to sign and return a letter to Roche acknowledging that they had reviewed the training materials, for Roche to then send stickers to doctors, which doctors would have to place on prescriptions they give people after they have confirmed a negative pregnancy test; prescriptions could only be written for 30 days and could not be renewed, thus requiring a new pregnancy test for each prescription.

In February 2002, Roche's patents for isotretinoin expired, and there are now many other companies selling cheaper generic versions of the drug. On 29 June 2009, Roche Pharmaceuticals, the original creator and distributor of isotretinoin, officially discontinued both the manufacture and distribution of their Accutane brand in the United States due to what the company described as business reasons related to low market share (below 5%), coupled with the high cost of defending personal injury lawsuits brought by some people who took the drug. Roche USA continues to defend Accutane and claims to have treated over 13million people since its introduction in 1982. F. Hoffmann-La Roche Ltd. apparently will continue to manufacture and distribute Roaccutane outside of the United States.

Among others, actor James Marshall sued Roche over allegedly Accutane-related disease that resulted in removal of his colon. The jury, however, decided that James Marshall had a pre-existing bowel disease.

Several trials over inflammatory bowel disease claims have been held in the United States, with many of them resulting in multimillion-dollar judgments against the makers of isotretinoin.

Society and culture

Brands
As of 2017, isotretinoin was marketed under many brand names worldwide: A-Cnotren, Absorica, Accuran, Accutane, Accutin, Acne Free, Acnecutan, Acnegen, Acnemin, Acneone, Acneral, Acnestar, Acnetane, Acnetin A, Acnetrait, Acnetrex, Acnogen, Acnotin, Acnotren, Acretin, Actaven, Acugen, Acutret, Acutrex, Ai Si Jie, Aisoskin, Aknal, Aknefug Iso, Aknenormin, Aknesil, Aknetrent, Amnesteem, Atlacne, Atretin, Axotret, Casius, Ciscutan, Claravis, Contracné, Curacne, Curacné, Curakne, Curatane, Cuticilin, Decutan, Dercutane, Effederm, Epuris, Eudyna, Farmacne, Flexresan, Flitrion, I-Ret, Inerta, Inflader, Inotrin, Isac, Isdiben, Isoacne, Isobest, Isocural, Isoderm, Isoface, IsoGalen, Isogeril, Isolve, Isoprotil, Isoriac, Isosupra, Isosupra Lidose, Isotane, Isotina, Isotinon, Isotren, Isotret, Isotretinoin, Isotretinoina, Isotretinoína, Isotretinoine, Isotretinoïne, Isotrétinoïne, Isotretinoinum, Isotrex, Isotrin, Isotroin, Izotek, Izotziaja, Lisacne, Locatret, Mayesta, Myorisan, Neotrex, Netlook, Nimegen, Noitron, Noroseptan, Novacne, Oralne, Oraret, Oratane, Piplex, Policano, Procuta, Reducar, Retacnyl, Retin A, Roaccutan, Roaccutane, Roacnetan, Roacta, Roacutan, Rocne, Rocta, Sotret, Stiefotrex, Tai Er Si, Teweisi, Tretin, Tretinac, Tretinex, Tretiva, Tufacne, Zenatane, Zerocutan, Zonatian ME, and Zoretanin.

As of 2017, it was marketed as a topical combination drug with erythromycin under the brand names Isotrex Eritromicina, Isotrexin, and Munderm.

Research
While excessive bone growth has been raised as a possible side effect, a 2006 review found little evidence for this.

References

External links 
 

Cyclohexenes
Dermatoxins
Enones
Hoffmann-La Roche brands
Isotretinoin
Polyenes